The 2012 Shonan Bellmare season sees Shonan Bellmare compete in J.League Division 2 for the second consecutive season after being relegated from J1 in 2010, and 16th season overall in the second tier. Shonan Bellmare are also competing in the 2012 Emperor's Cup.

Players

Competitions

J.League

League table

Matches

Emperor's Cup

References

Shonan Bellmare
Shonan Bellmare seasons